Antonín Jan Frič (in German: Anton Johann Fritsch, 30 June 1832 – 15 November 1913) was a Czech paleontologist, biologist and geologist, living during the Austria-Hungary era. Professor at the Charles University and later became director of the National Museum in Prague. He became famous for his contributions on the field of Permo - Carboniferous ecosystems.

He also became known for finding fossils once attributed to dinosaurs - Albisaurus albinus and Ponerosteus exogyrarum and so far the only pterosaur known from the Czech Republic, Cretornis hlavaci. The pterosaur was small with a wingspan of about 1.5 m and lived in the Turonian.

The first true dinosaur known from the Czech Republic was discovered 90 years after Frič's death (in 2003). It is a small ornithopod of Cenomanian age.

Fritsch received the Lyell Medal from the Geological Society of London in 1902.

Bibliography 
  (in English: "Natural History of European Birds")

References

External links

1832 births
1913 deaths
19th-century Czech people
19th-century Austrian people
Czech paleontologists
Czech biologists
Czech geologists
Scientists from Prague
Lyell Medal winners
Academic staff of Charles University